IPCA may refer to:

Organisations:
 International Prison Chaplains' Association
 Indo-Pacific Conservation Alliance
 Polytechnic Institute of Cávado and Ave, a Portuguese polytechnic institute
 Independent Police Conduct Authority, an organisation overseeing the New Zealand Police
 International Physically Disabled Chess Association

Fiction:
 International Presidential Consulting Agency, a fictional agency in the video game series Syphon Filter

See also
 ACPI, misspelling in some MSI BIOSes